The Sorcerer's Apprentice (1955) is a short film made by Michael Powell for Norddeutscher Rundfunk (NDR) West German television.

It is the 1797 Goethe story of the same name presented as a ballet performed by the Frankfurt Opera with Sonia Arova as the solo dancer. There are other character dancers appearing as various items and creatures and of course the Sorcerer himself. But none of these are named on the credits and nobody has managed to find out who they were, as yet. The English-language narrator is also uncredited.

Production
The original apparently ran for about 30 minutes. But the only version that seems to exist is this 13-minute version. There are probably many small cuts rather than any big ones because the bulk of the story appears to be there although some of the cutting seems choppy.

Michael Powell was hired to direct it for his old friend Hein Heckroth. Heckroth had already done the design and set everything up so Powell appears to have had little input.

Notes

External links
 
 

1955 films
1955 television films
1955 short films
1955 musical films
German musical films
West German films
German television films
German drama short films
1950s English-language films
English-language German films
Films directed by Michael Powell
Films by Powell and Pressburger
Films based on works by Johann Wolfgang von Goethe
Ballet films
Works based on The Sorcerer's Apprentice
1950s German films
Das Erste original programming